Therèse is a 1916 Swedish silent drama film directed by Victor Sjöström.

Cast
 Lili Bech as Therèse
 Josua Bengtsson as Detective
 Lars Hanson as Gerhard
 Albin Lavén as Rell
 Albert Ståhl as Donne
 Robert Sterling as Ramb
 Mathias Taube as Kembell
 Jenny Tschernichin-Larsson as Therese's Mother

References

External links

1916 films
1910s Swedish-language films
Swedish black-and-white films
1916 drama films
Swedish silent films
Films directed by Victor Sjöström
Swedish drama films
Silent drama films